The 2021–22 NBL season was the 33rd season for the Sydney Kings in the NBL.

Roster

Pre-season

Ladder

Game log 

|-style="background:#fcc;"
| 1
| 13 November
| S.E. Melbourne
| L 75–81
| Jarell Martin (15)
| Martin, Vodanovich (9)
| Xavier Cooks (3)
| Melbourne Sports and Aquatic Centreclosed event
| 0–1
|-style="background:#cfc;"
| 2
| 15 November
| Melbourne
| W 80–75
| Angus Glover (18)
| Xavier Cooks (14)
| Bayles, Cooks (4)
| Melbourne Sports and Aquatic Centreclosed event
| 1–1
|-style="background:#fcc;"
| 3
| 18 November
| @ New Zealand
| L 97–93
| Jaylen Adams (16)
| Xavier Cooks (11)
| Adams, Cooks (3)
| Melbourne Sports and Aquatic Centreclosed event
| 1–2

|-style="background:#ccc;"
| 1
| 27 November
| @ Illawarra
| colspan="6" | Cancelled

Regular season

Ladder

Game log 

|-style="background:#cfc;"
| 1
| 5 December
| Melbourne
| W 79–74
| Jaylen Adams (15)
| Adams, Martin (8)
| Xavier Cooks (5)
| Qudos Bank Arena8,632
| 1–0
|-style="background:#fcc;"
| 2
| 11 December
| Illawarra
| L 84–92
| Angus Glover (16)
| Xavier Cooks (11)
| Bruce, Cooks (5)
| Qudos Bank Arena6,212
| 1–1
|-style="background:#fcc;"
| 3
| 16 December
| @ Melbourne
| L 89–47
| Xavier Cooks (12)
| Xavier Cooks (6)
| Biwali Bayles (4)
| John Cain Arena4,786
| 1–2
|-style="background:#cfc;"
| 4
| 18 December
| S.E. Melbourne
| W 84–73
| Xavier Cooks (19)
| Jarell Martin (13)
| Bayles, Bruce, Cooks, Glover (2)
| Qudos Bank Arena6,379
| 2–2
|-style="background:#cfc;"
| 5
| 22 December
| Tasmania
| W 83–71
| Jarell Martin (24)
| Jarell Martin (11)
| Shaun Bruce (5)
| Qudos Bank Arena4,612
| 3–2
|-style="background:#fcc;"
| 6
| 26 December
| Melbourne
| L 68–82
| Jarell Martin (19)
| Xavier Cooks (10)
| Xavier Cooks (4)
| Qudos Bank Arena4,725
| 3–3

|-style="background:#fcc;"
| 7
| 13 January
| @ Illawarra
| L 97–89
| Jarell Martin (23)
| Xavier Cooks (14)
| Jaylen Adams (8)
| WIN Entertainment Centre1,994
| 3–4
|-style="background:#fcc;"
| 8
| 16 January
| New Zealand
| L 75–82
| Xavier Cooks (19)
| Xavier Cooks (12)
| Bruce, Vasiljevic (4)
| Qudos Bank Arena4,356
| 3–5
|-style="background:#fcc;"
| 9
| 21 January
| @ Brisbane
| L 96–87
| Jaylen Adams (33)
| Jarell Martin (12)
| Jaylen Adams (7)
| Nissan Arena2,574
| 3–6
|-style="background:#cfc;"
| 10
| 23 January
| Brisbane
| W 97–73
| Dejan Vasiljevic (23)
| Jarell Martin (12)
| Jaylen Adams (6)
| Qudos Bank Arena4,237
| 4–6
|-style="background:#cfc;"
| 11
| 30 January
| Perth
| W 96–81
| Jaylen Adams (30)
| Xavier Cooks (9)
| Jaylen Adams (9)
| Qudos Bank Arena5,864
| 5–6

|-style="background:#fcc;"
| 12
| 4 February
| @ Tasmania
| L 77–70
| Jaylen Adams (24)
| Xavier Cooks (15)
| Jaylen Adams (3)
| MyState Bank Arena4,643
| 5–7
|-style="background:#cfc;"
| 13
| 6 February
| New Zealand
| W 84–65
| Dejan Vasiljevic (23)
| Jarell Martin (12)
| Jaylen Adams (7)
| Qudos Bank Arena5,011
| 6–7
|-style="background:#cfc;"
| 14
| 10 February
| @ S.E. Melbourne
| W 87–92
| Xavier Cooks (23)
| Adams, Martin (8)
| Jaylen Adams (6)
| John Cain Arena2,133
| 7–7
|-style="background:#cfc;"
| 15
| 13 February
| Brisbane
| W 71–69
| Jarell Martin (17)
| Xavier Cooks (12)
| Adams, Bruce, Glover (4)
| Qudos Bank Arena5,543
| 7–6
|-style="background:#cfc;"
| 16
| 19 February
| Perth
| W 98–95
| Jaylen Adams (31)
| Xavier Cooks (9)
| Jaylen Adams (10)
| Qudos Bank Arena7,143
| 9–7
|-style="background:#cfc;"
| 17
| 27 February
| @ Adelaide
| W 90–93
| Jaylen Adams (26)
| Xavier Cooks (10)
| Jaylen Adams (8)
| Adelaide Entertainment Centre4,813
| 10–7

|-style="background:#cfc;"
| 18
| 6 March
| Cairns
| W 98–88
| Xavier Cooks (23)
| Xavier Cooks (13)
| Xavier Cooks (5)
| Qudos Bank Arena9,112
| 11–7
|-style="background:#cfc;"
| 19
| 13 March
| @ Cairns
| W 77–86
| Jaylen Adams (24)
| Makur Maker (10)
| Jaylen Adams (7)
| Cairns Convention Centre3,629
| 12–7
|-style="background:#cfc;"
| 20
| 19 March
| @ S.E. Melbourne
| W 89–91
| Jarell Martin (24)
| Jarell Martin (8)
| Jaylen Adams (8)
| John Cain Arena2,717
| 13–7
|-style="background:#cfc;"
| 21
| 26 March
| @ Perth
| W 80–102
| Jaylen Adams (20)
| Makur Maker (9)
| Jaylen Adams (8)
| RAC Arena6,906
| 14–7

|-style="background:#cfc;"
| 22
| 3 April
| @ Tasmania
| W 83–103
| Jaylen Adams (20)
| Xavier Cooks (9)
| Xavier Cooks (9)
| MyState Bank Arena4,738
| 15–7
|-style="background:#cfc;"
| 23
| 9 April
| @ Adelaide
| W 77–84
| Xavier Cooks (22)
| Xavier Cooks (9)
| Jaylen Adams (5)
| Adelaide Entertainment Centre4,748
| 16–7
|-style="background:#cfc;"
| 24
| 12 April
| @ New Zealand
| W 70–76
| Jaylen Adams (19)
| Xavier Cooks (7)
| Jaylen Adams (5)
| Bendigo Stadium1,543
| 17–7
|-style="background:#cfc;"
| 25
| 14 April
| @ Illawarra
| W 102–107 (OT)
| Dejan Vasiljevic (33)
| Xavier Cooks (13)
| Adams, Cooks (7)
| WIN Entertainment Centre4,872
| 18–7
|-style="background:#fcc;"
| 26
| 17 April
| Adelaide
| L 82–90
| Jaylen Adams (28)
| Xavier Cooks (14)
| Jaylen Adams (4)
| Qudos Bank Arena10,260
| 18–8
|-style="background:#cfc;"
| 27
| 21 April
| @ Cairns
| W 77–87
| Ian Clark (21)
| Xavier Cooks (12)
| Shaun Bruce (4)
| Cairns Convention Centre3,150
| 19–8
|-style="background:#fcc;"
| 26
| 24 April
| Illawarra
| L 84–87
| Xavier Cooks (20)
| Xavier Cooks (14)
| Ian Clark (6)
| Qudos Bank Arena12,632
| 19–9

Postseason 

|-style="background:#cfc;"
| 1
| 29 April
| @ Illawarra
| W 79–89
| Jaylen Adams (30)
| Cooks, Martin (10)
| Jaylen Adams (5)
| WIN Entertainment Centre5,621
| 1–0
|-style="background:#cfc;"
| 2
| 1 May
| Illawarra
| W 99–87
| Jaylen Adams (29)
| Xavier Cooks (11)
| Adams, Cooks (3)
| Qudos Bank Arena9,824
| 2–0

|-style="background:#cfc;"
| 3
| 6 May
| Tasmania
| W 95–78
| Jaylen Adams (18)
| Xavier Cooks (11)
| Xavier Cooks (7)
| Qudos Bank Arena12,765
| 3–0
|-style="background:#cfc;"
| 4
| 8 May
| @ Tasmania
| W 86–90
| Cooks, Martin, Vasiljevic (20)
| Cooks, Martin (10)
| Shaun Bruce (7)
| MyState Bank Arena4,738
| 4–0
|-style="background:#cfc;"
| 5
| 11 May
| Tasmania
| W 97–88
| Xavier Cooks (23)
| Jarell Martin (17)
| Shaun Bruce (8)
| Qudos Bank Arena16,149
| 5–0

Transactions

Re-signed

Additions

Subtractions

Awards

Club awards 
 Members Player of the Year: Jaylen Adams & Xavier Cooks 
 Coaches Award: Xavier Cooks
 Player's Player: Xavier Cooks 
 Defensive Player: Xavier Cooks
 Club Person of the Year: Fleur McIntyre
 Club MVP: Jaylen Adams

See also 
 2021–22 NBL season
 Sydney Kings

References

External links 

 Official Website

Sydney Kings
Sydney Kings seasons
Sydney Kings season